Konstantin Vladimirovich Prikhodtchenko (born 29 March 1972 in Belgorod) is a Russian sport shooter. He won a silver medal for the 50 m rifle three positions at the 2002 ISSF World Shooting Championships in Lahti, Finland, with a score of 1255.4 points. He is also a member of CSKA Moscow and is coached and trained by Victor Vlasov.

At age thirty-two, Prikhodtchenko made his official debut for the 2004 Summer Olympics in Athens, where he placed twenty-ninth in the preliminary rounds of the men's 10 m air rifle, for a total score of 589 points, tying his position with three other shooters including Slovenia's Rajmond Debevec.

At the 2008 Summer Olympics in Beijing, Prikodtchenko competed only in two rifle shooting events. He scored a total of 698.4 points (595 in the preliminary rounds and 103.4 in the final), and a bonus of 10.0 from a shoot-off (against Hungary's Péter Sidi) in the men's 10 m air rifle, finishing only in fifth place. Few days later, Prikodtchenko placed fifth again this time in the 50 m rifle prone, by one tenth of a point (0.1) behind Norway's Vebjørn Berg, with a total score of 699.0 points (595 in the preliminary rounds and 104 in the final).

References

External links
NBC 2008 Olympics profile

Russian male sport shooters
Living people
Olympic shooters of Russia
Shooters at the 2004 Summer Olympics
Shooters at the 2008 Summer Olympics
People from Belgorod
1972 births
Sportspeople from Belgorod Oblast